Wilfred Leonard "Len" Quested (9 January 1925 – 20 August 2012) was an English footballer. Quested played one match for England B as well as being selected as a travelling reserve for a Full International for England. He played two unofficial internationals for Australia. He was born in Folkestone, England.

Quested was stationed with the Royal Navy on the H.M.S. Golden Hind. Playing for the Golden Hind team in the NSWSFA Division One team he played Jack Aston and John Ball who would later go on to play with distinction in England.

After his stint in Australia, Quested returned to England playing with Folkestone Town F.C. in 1946 and 1947 before signing with Fulham F.C. where he played between 1947 and 1951. In 1951 he signed for Huddersfield Town A.F.C. where he played until 1957.

In 1957 he emigrated to Australia with his Australian born wife. On arriving in Australia he was signed by Auburn in the NSW state league. He played with Auburn until 1960. In 1961 he signed for Hakoah where he played for a season before retiring. In 1964 Quested coached Cumberland United in the NSW state league but in 1965 Quested made a return to playing for Awaba in Newcastle. He also appears to have represented Australia at national level.

For much of his later life Quested devoted his football skills to developing young footballers and coached Robbie Slater amongst others.

Quested died on 20 August 2012 in Queensland, Australia.

References

External links
Career statistics

1925 births
2012 deaths
People from Folkestone
Australian soccer players
English emigrants to Australia
English footballers
England B international footballers
Fulham F.C. players
Huddersfield Town A.F.C. players
Australian soccer coaches
English football managers
English Football League players
Association football defenders
Association football midfielders
Folkestone F.C. players
20th-century Royal Navy personnel